Cyprinus yunnanensis is a critically endangered species of cyprinid fish in the genus Cyprinus from Qilu Lake in  Yunnan, China. Despite surveys of the lake it has not been seen since the 1970s and it is possibly extinct.

References 

Cyprinus
Taxa named by Tchang Tchung-Lin
Fish described in 1933